Anthony Jordan may refer to:

 Anthony D. Jordan (born 1934), English badminton player
 Anthony J. Jordan, Irish biographer

See also
 Tony Jordan (disambiguation)